Using Sickness as a Hero is an EP by American grindcore band Human Remains. It was released in 1996 through Relapse Records. Contrasting with the big budget death metal productions of its era, the EP is considered as an "overlooked classic" by many underground grindcore and death metal followers.

The EP has largely been out of print since it has been replaced by the Where Were You When anthology. In 2015, however, Relapse Records repressed the recording on vinyl with added demo tracks as part of its 25th anniversary reissue series.

Critical reception

AllMusic critic William York described the record "as close as Human Remains ever got to making a real album" and thought that the band "sound both experimental and violently intense at the same time, mixing together blastbeat sections, heavy mid-tempo breakdowns, and strange, almost robotic-sounding parts where the guitars are making strange, clipped tapping noises." York also noted "the refreshing absence of any clichéd death metal or grindcore riffs throughout the recording." Chronicles of Chaos' Brian Meloon described the record as "a good effort," but found it "a little too unfocussed for its own good" and sometimes "too chaotic to retain the heaviness that they appear to be going for."

Track listing

Personnel
Human Remains
 Paul Miller – vocals
 Steve Procopio – guitar
 Jim Baglino – guitar
 William Carl Black – bass
 Dave Witte – drums

Production and artwork
Steve Evett - production, engineering, mixing
Human Remains - production, mixing
Wes Benscoter - cover artwork
Bill Yurkiewickz - photography, mastering
Eric Horst - graphic design
Dave Shirk - mastering

References

External links
 
 Using Sickness as a Hero on Bandcamp

1996 EPs
Human Remains albums
Death metal EPs
Grindcore EPs
Relapse Records EPs
Deathgrind EPs